Alfred William "Al" Edel (July 30, 1935 – July 3, 2005) was a veteran news broadcaster who anchored the newscast for the Voice of America on shortwave radio.

Biography

Al Edel was born in Buffalo, New York.  He graduated from the College of Wooster in Ohio and received his master's in communications from Syracuse University.  Edel worked for radio station, WBKW in Buffalo before moving to Frankfurt, Germany in 1960 to broadcast on the thirteen station American Forces Network in Europe.  In 1966, he moved to New York City to join ABC Radio News to anchor the network's newscasts, which were broadcast across the United States.  In 1969, Edel moved to Sioux Falls, South Dakota to anchor the television newscasts for KSOO-TV (later renamed KSFY-TV).  In 1980, he moved to Washington, DC, where he worked at ABC as a news writer for Good Morning America.  In 1982, Edel anchored the newscasts on the Voice of America shortwave radio service for eighteen years.

After his retirement in 2000, Al Edel moved to Utah.  On July 3, 2005, he died of cancer at the age of 69 in a hospice in St. George, Utah.  He was survived by his wife, two sons, and three granddaughters.  He had requested that no funeral or memorial service be held.

External links

Al Edel's obituary in The Washington Post.
S. D. Watch Blog entry

1935 births
2005 deaths
Syracuse University alumni
American male journalists
College of Wooster alumni
Radio personalities from Buffalo, New York
People from Sioux Falls, South Dakota
People from St. George, Utah
South Dakota television anchors
South Dakota television reporters
Deaths from cancer in Utah
Journalists from South Dakota
Journalists from New York (state)
Television personalities from Buffalo, New York
20th-century American journalists